Streets named the Rue Sainte-Catherine, French for Saint Catherine Street, are found in the following cities:

Rue Sainte-Catherine (Bordeaux)
Rue Sainte-Catherine (Lyon)
Rue Sainte-Catherine (Montreal)

Odonyms referring to religion